Mynydd Graig Goch (Welsh, 'mountain of the red rock') is the western end peak of the Nantlle Ridge, and is a subsidiary summit of Craig Cwm Silyn. It is also the most westerly 2000 ft peak in Wales. For many years it was excluded from lists of the Welsh 2000 ft hills due to a spot height of 609m on OS maps. However, this changed in 2008; after years of speculation a group of hillwalkers carried out a precise GPS survey of the peak, measuring the absolute height as 609.75 m (2000.49 ft).

Panorama and topography
The summit is boulder strewn, crowned by several tors of rock, of which one is the true summit. The southern and western flanks consist of large boulder fields. The north-east face has steep cliffs, that form the backwall of the glacial Cwm Dulyn. Cwm Dulyn's lake Llyn Cwm Dulyn contains a population of Arctic char. Views from the summit are extensive, overseeing Lleyn and the coast. Garnedd Goch, Mynydd Mawr, Moel Hebog and Yr Wyddfa (Snowdon) are all observable.

References

External links
 Photos of summit at Geograph.org.uk

Clynnog
Dolbenmaen
Mountains and hills of Gwynedd
Mountains and hills of Snowdonia
Hewitts of Wales
Nuttalls